The Christine Diamond is a 1940 novel by the British writer Marie Belloc Lowndes.

References

Bibliography
 Vinson, James. Twentieth-Century Romance and Gothic Writers. Macmillan, 1982.

1940 British novels
Novels by Marie Belloc Lowndes
Hutchinson (publisher) books